Eugene Raymond Marve (August 14, 1960 – May 24, 2021) was an American professional football player who was a linebacker in the National Football League (NFL) for the Buffalo Bills, Tampa Bay Buccaneers, and the San Diego Chargers. He played college football at Saginaw Valley State University and became the first player from the school to play in the NFL. He was inducted into the SVSU Cardinal Athletic Hall of Fame as a member of its inaugural class in 2010.

Marve led the Bills in tackles in a season three times. He was traded by Buffalo to Tampa Bay in exchange for an 8th round draft pick.

His son, Robert Marve, won the Florida Mr. Football Award in 2007 and was the starting quarterback at the University of Miami, before transferring to Purdue University.

He died on May 24, 2021, at the age of 60, after a brief hospital stay. He was survived by his wife Stacey, son Robert and daughter Rebecca.

References

1960 births
2021 deaths
American football linebackers
Buffalo Bills players
Players of American football from Flint, Michigan
Saginaw Valley State Cardinals football players
San Diego Chargers players
Tampa Bay Buccaneers players